Ziyad Al-Johani (born 11 November 2001) is a Saudi Arabian footballer who plays as a midfielder for Saudi Pro League side Al-Ahli.

Career
Al-Johani started his career at the youth teams of Al-Ahli. He was first called up to the first team after the 2019–20 season resumed following the COVID-19 pandemic. He signed his first professional contract for the club on 8 August 2020. He was then named on the bench for the first time in the derby match against Al-Ittihad a day later. He made his first-team on 30 May 2021 in the final league match of the season against Al-Ettifaq.

Career statistics

Club

Honours

International
Saudi Arabia U23
AFC U-23 Asian Cup: 2022
WAFF U-23 Championship: 2022

References

External links
 
 

2001 births
Living people
Sportspeople from Jeddah
Association football midfielders
Saudi Arabian footballers
Saudi Arabia youth international footballers
Al-Ahli Saudi FC players
Saudi Professional League players
Saudi First Division League players